"Love Has No Right" is a song co-written and recorded by American country music artist Billy Joe Royal.  It was released in May 1989 as the second single from the album Tell It Like It Is.  The song reached number 4 on the Billboard Hot Country Singles & Tracks chart.  It was written by Royal, Nelson Larkin and Randy Scruggs.

Chart performance

Year-end charts

References

1989 singles
1989 songs
Billy Joe Royal songs
Songs written by Randy Scruggs
Atlantic Records singles
Songs written by Nelson Larkin